The Ellis Jennings House is located in Neenah, Wisconsin.

History
The house belonged to Ellis Jennings, a partner in a local lumber company. It was added to the State and the National Register of Historic Places in 1992.

References

Houses on the National Register of Historic Places in Wisconsin
National Register of Historic Places in Winnebago County, Wisconsin
Houses in Winnebago County, Wisconsin
Queen Anne architecture in Wisconsin
Limestone buildings in the United States
Houses completed in 1893